Clifford Michael Brumbaugh (born April 21, 1974) is an American former Major League Baseball outfielder who played for the Texas Rangers and Colorado Rockies in 2001.

Amateur career
A native of Wilmington, Delaware, Brumbaugh attended William Penn High School and played college baseball for Delaware under head coach Bob Hannah. In 1994, he played collegiate summer baseball with the Falmouth Commodores of the Cape Cod Baseball League. He was named America East Player of the Year in 1995.

Professional career

Major League Baseball
Brumbaugh was drafted by the Texas Rangers in the 13th round of the 1995 Major League Baseball draft. However, his major league career was mostly spent as a pinch hitter, and this would be the only home run of his major league career. He moved from Texas to the Colorado Rockies later that season, featuring in 14 further MLB games.

International baseball
Despite performing well in the minors, Brumbaugh was never called up by the White Sox and moved to South Korea's Hyundai Unicorns later in 2003. In 2003, he had the highest all-time batting average and RBI total in the Korea Series Championship history. His 2004 season was even more impressive, as he came close to winning the KBO League Triple Crown with a .343 batting average (tops in the league), 33 home runs (second), and 105 RBI (third). He was given a Golden Glove Award as recognition of his achievements.

He remained with the team in  after Hyundai sold the franchise, which was renamed Woori Heroes and relocated from Suwon to Seoul. 

After a year with the Piratas de Campeche, he spent 2010 with the Edmonton Capitals in the Golden Baseball League.

References

External links

Career statistics and player information from Korea Baseball Organization

1974 births
Living people
Major League Baseball outfielders
Baseball players from Wilmington, Delaware
Texas Rangers players
Colorado Rockies players
American expatriate baseball players in Japan
Orix Buffaloes players
Hudson Valley Renegades players
Charleston RiverDogs players
Charlotte Rangers players
Tulsa Drillers players
Oklahoma RedHawks players
Colorado Springs Sky Sox players
Charlotte Knights players
American expatriate baseball players in South Korea
KBO League outfielders
Hyundai Unicorns players
Kiwoom Heroes players
Edmonton Capitals players
Delaware Fightin' Blue Hens baseball players
Falmouth Commodores players
Acereros de Monclova players
American expatriate baseball players in Mexico
American expatriate baseball players in Canada